William Paton may refer to:

William Andrew Paton (1889–1991), American accountant and a founder of the American Accounting Association 
William J. Paton, Scottish footballer who played for Motherwell
Willie Paton, Scottish footballer who played for Rangers
William Paton (ecumenist) (1886–1943), General Secretary of the National Christian Council of India, Burma and Ceylon between 1922 and 1927
Sir William D.M. Paton (1917–1993), British pharmacologist, son of the above

See also
William Patton (disambiguation)
William Patten (disambiguation)